Maktab Rendah Sains MARA Gerik, commonly known as MRSM Gerik, is a co-educational boarding school established in 1994 under Education and Training (Secondary) Division of MARA (Majlis Amanah Rakyat, Malay for People's Trust Council). The campus is located in Gerik, Hulu Perak District, Perak, Malaysia.

Background 
MRSM Gerik was completed in 1991. It is located in Nassah hill, Kampung Kenayat, with an area of 75 acres. The distance from Gerik town is about 13 km.

The recruitment of MRSM Gerik teachers and staff began on December 1, 1993. The initial phase of student recruitment was at the end of January 1994 where MRSM Gerik recruited students from Form 2 to 94 while in February 1994 the Form 1 students were 144.

In the early stages, there was not much infrastructure available but now, with the completion of phase 2 construction, MRSM Gerik has been equipped with a variety of facilities and equipment to meet the educational needs and requirements. The construction of phase 2 involves the addition of offices, halls, living skills workshops, dormitories, principal's homes and assistant principals, teachers' homes and staff homes.

Student development 
 There are some student organisations that empower MRSM students:

1. Student Representative Council (BWP)

Consists of students elected by students through the electoral process. The main BWP roles are:

 Promote the welfare of students in collaboration with College administration.
 Become a medium for the student body and administration.
 Organize student activities
 Facilitate the implementation of College activities.

2. Student Disciplinary Board

Student Disciplinary Board (LDP) is one of the branches of extra-curricular activities that helps college students enforce college regulations. LDP Student Disciplinary Board was established to:

 Create a harmonious learning environment in MRSM where students are disciplined and honorable.
 Create a generation of students with good leadership characteristics.
 Names of eligible students who have leadership qualities will be proposed and an interview will be conducted for their selection process.

Alumni
The alumni association of MRSM Gerik is known as the ANSARA Gerik (ANak SAins  MARA Gerik).

BATCH:

Nasah2.0

Nasah2.0 is the official alumni for the 2nd batch of MRSM Gerik (SPM 98). They registered at Bukit Nasah on 28 March 1994 (1st intake), the same year the school was opened. Nasah2.0 was the first batch that studied here starting in Form 1 as the first batch joined when they were already in Form 2. The batch comprises 147 students spread out to six classes and 10 homerooms. The school was still lacking a lot of facilities back in year 1994, including water and electricity problem. 

V6

V6 is the official alumni for the 6th batch of MRSM Gerik (PMR 2000).

Notable alumni 
 Amirizwan Taj Tajuddin - Malaysia national footballer currently plays for Angkatan Tentera Malaysia FA in Malaysia Super League
 Ahmad Shahir Ismail - Footballer currently plays for Melaka United in Malaysia Premier League

References

Educational institutions established in 1994
1994 establishments in Malaysia